Lodeizen is a surname. Notable people with the surname include:

 Hans Lodeizen (1924–1950), Dutch poet
 Rifka Lodeizen (born 1972), Dutch actress